The canton of Bourgs sur Colagne (before March 2020: canton of Chirac) is an administrative division of the Lozère department, southern France. It was created at the French canton reorganisation which came into effect in March 2015. Its seat is in Bourgs sur Colagne.

It consists of the following communes:

Balsièges
Barjac
Bourgs sur Colagne
Cultures
Esclanèdes
Gabrias
Grèzes
Montrodat
Palhers
Saint-Bonnet-de-Chirac
Saint-Germain-du-Teil
Les Salelles

References

Cantons of Lozère